Leptolingia is an extinct genus of lacewing insect, which existed in what is now China during the Middle Jurassic period. It contains the species L. jurassica, L. tianyiensis, L. calonervis, and L. imminuta. L. imminuta is the smallest known species in the family Grammolingiidae.

References

Prehistoric insect genera
Neuroptera genera
Fossil taxa described in 2011
Insects described in 2011
Insects of China
Jurassic insects of Asia
Middle Jurassic insects